King Park is a small historic town park and beach at 125 Wellington Avenue in Newport, Rhode Island. It was the landing site of General Rochambeau during the Revolutionary War, and the park currently features a statue honoring Rochambeau's landing as a well as a beach, playground, dinghy dock, and little league baseball field.

In 1780 General Rochambeau's army of 6,000 French soldiers landed on site of what is now King Park.  In the 1897 the heirs of Edward King, the builder of the nearby Edward King House, donated the land for the creation of the park. It was built between 1897 and 1902. August A. Noel designed the bath house. In 1928 the Newport Historical Society erected the monument to General Rochambeau's landing. The large stone pier was originally "dock area for the original America's Cup Regattas when they resumed here after WWII. Hurricanes destroyed the wooden finger dock structures and they were never rebuilt."  The substantial stone pier is currently the site of one of the town's dinghy docks and is adjacent to a boat launch ramp.

References

Geography of Newport, Rhode Island
Protected areas of Newport County, Rhode Island
Tourist attractions in Newport, Rhode Island
Protected areas established in 1897
1897 establishments in Rhode Island